Peter Müller (6 June 1928 – April 2013) was a Swiss boxer. He competed in the men's welterweight event at the 1952 Summer Olympics.

References

External links
 

1928 births
2013 deaths
Swiss male boxers
Olympic boxers of Switzerland
Boxers at the 1952 Summer Olympics
Welterweight boxers